Adrian Alexandru Mărkuș (born 4 October 1992, in Oțelu Roșu) is a Romanian footballer who plays as a forward.

Club statistics

Updated to games played as of 8 December 2013.

External links
 
 

1992 births
Living people
People from Caraș-Severin County
Romanian footballers
Association football forwards
Romania youth international footballers
Romania under-21 international footballers
CF Liberty Oradea players
FC UTA Arad players
Liga I players
Liga II players
Nemzeti Bajnokság I players
FC Bihor Oradea players
Kaposvári Rákóczi FC players
CS Gaz Metan Mediaș players
FC Viitorul Constanța players
FC Olimpia Satu Mare players
Metropolitan Police F.C. players
Haringey Borough F.C. players
Romanian expatriate footballers
Romanian expatriate sportspeople in Hungary
Expatriate footballers in Hungary
Romanian expatriate sportspeople in England
Expatriate footballers in England